Jeffery Alan Fernengel is an American pop artist raised in Greater Cleveland. Born in November 1977, he started drawing sharks and dinosaurs at a very young age.  In 1997 he moved to Columbus, Ohio to attend Ohio State University.

His first public exhibition was at Larry's Bar  in 1999 after observing they had not displayed new artwork on their walls for years. Since then he has had numerous exhibitions at galleries and group shows around Columbus including a billboard after being awarded as a runner up in the 2009 PBR Art contest.

His last exhibition in Ohio was at It Looks Like We Are Open gallery on February 9, 2013.

Jeff's artwork was featured on a limited edition beer bottle by Seventh Son Brewery  in March 2016 

Jeff Fernengle is an AVID Denver Broncoes Fan. He has not missed a single broncos football game in his entire life. He has had Numerous Denver Broncos jerseys and posters hanging on his walls his entire life. Many times Jeff has cited that not only is John Elway the Greatest quarterback in NFL History, but also the Greatest athlete in the history of all sports. Jeff constantly cites John Elway as not only a personal and professional hero, but also, the single greatest inspiration he has had in his entire life.

References

External links
 Website

Living people
People from Greater Cleveland
1977 births